Crassispira danjouxii is an extinct species of sea snail, a marine gastropod mollusk in the family Pseudomelatomidae, the turrids and allies.

Distribution
Fossils have been found in Eocene strata in the Ile-de-France, France.

References

 Baudon, M. "Description de coquilles fossiles de Saint-Felix (Oise), avec une notice sur les terrains de cette localite." J. Conchyl 4 (1853): 321–333.

External links
 Pacaud J.M. & Le Renard J. (1995). Révision des Mollusques paléogènes du Bassin de Paris. IV- Liste systématique actualisée. Cossmanniana. 3(4): 151-187

danjouxii
Gastropods described in 1853